The Capital District was an area in Nova Scotia's Halifax Regional Municipality designated as  Nova Scotia's centre of business, government, events and attractions.

It was created in 2002 as a means to focus on improving services in the municipality's central business district (CBD).  It was disbanded in 2010.

The CBD includes the following areas:

 Downtown Halifax, an area on the western side of Halifax Harbour.
 Downtown Dartmouth, an area on the eastern side of Halifax Harbour
 the business districts of Spring Garden Road, Quinpool Road, and Gottingen Street on the Halifax Peninsula. 
 
The Capital District includes a "task force" with representation from the municipal government, the provincial government, as well as members of the business community and waterfront development agencies.

External links
 Capital District Task Force

Communities in Halifax, Nova Scotia